Wolfgang Wetzel (born 11 May 1968) is a German politician. Born in Schlema, he represents the Alliance 90/The Greens. Wolfgang Wetzel has served as a member of the Bundestag from the state of Saxony from 2020 to October 2021.

Political career 
Wetzel became a member of the Bundestag in 2020 when he replaced Stephan Kühn who had resigned. In parliament, he has since been serving on the Petitions Committee.

References

External links 

 Bundestag biography 

1968 births
Living people
Members of the Bundestag for Saxony
Members of the Bundestag 2017–2021
Members of the Bundestag for Alliance 90/The Greens
LGBT members of the Bundestag
Gay politicians